A historical drama (also period drama, costume drama, and period piece) is a dramatic work set in a past time period, usually used in the context of film and television.

Historical drama, a type of historical fiction, includes historical romances, adventure films, and swashbucklers. A period piece may be set in a vague or general era such as the Middle Ages, or a specific period such as the Roaring Twenties, or the recent past.

Scholarship
In different eras different subgenres have risen to popularity, such as the westerns and sword and sandal films that dominated North American cinema in the 1950s. The costume drama is often separated as a genre of historical dramas. Early critics defined them as films focusing on romance and relationships in sumptuous surroundings, contrasting them with other historical dramas believed to have more serious themes. Other critics have defended costume dramas, and argued that they are disparaged because they are a genre directed towards women. Historical dramas have also been described as a conservative genre, glorifying an imagined past that never existed.

Historical accuracy

Historical drama may include mostly-fictionalized narratives based on actual people or historical events, such as the history plays of Shakespeare, Apollo 13, Braveheart, Chernobyl, Enemy at the Gates, Les Misérables, and Titanic.  Works may include references to real-life people or events from the relevant time period or contain factually accurate representations of the time period.

Works that focus on accurately portraying specific historical events or persons are instead known as docudrama, such as The Report. Where a person's life is central to the story, such a work is known as biographical drama, with notable examples being films such as Alexander, Cinderella Man, Frida, House of Saddam, Lincoln, Stalin, and W..

See also
 Historical fiction
 Jidaigeki, Japanese historical dramas
 Sageuk, Korean historical dramas
 List of films about the American Revolution
 List of films and television shows about the American Civil War
 List of films set in ancient Rome
 List of historical drama films and series set in Near Eastern and Western civilization
 Historical drama films set in Asia
 List of Vietnamese historical drama films
 Middle Ages in film
 War film

References

 
Drama
Film genres
Television genres